Sous Lieutenant Noël Hugues Anne Louis de Rochefort was a French World War I flying ace credited with seven aerial victories. He was one of the original French aces.

Biography
Noël Hugues Anne Louis de Rochefort was born in Cerdon, Loiret, France on 25 December 1887.
 
Rochefort's first duty in the military was as a driver. He was ill and in hospital for several months from November 1914 on. Upon recuperation, he applied for aviation service and earned his Military Pilot's Brevet on 14 August 1915. In October 1915, he was assigned to Escadrille 26. He scored his first victory on 12 March 1916, and by 14 September, he had six enemy airplanes and an observation balloon to his credit, along with five unconfirmed claims. The following day, 15 September, he was shot down and wounded. He died of his wounds the next day while in German captivity.

Honors and awards

Chevalier de la Légion d'honneur

"Sergent pilot of an army escadrille. A pilot of remarkable audacity and skill. On 22 May 1916, he pursued an enemy plane and downed it after a difficult combat. Already cited in army orders and the Médaille militaire for having downed two enemy planes previously." (Légion d'honneur citation, 10 June 1916)

Médaille militaire

"Sergent pilot. An ardent, skillful and tenacious pilot who has always given proof of great maturity, spirit and admirable courage. He has completed brilliantly all the reconnaissance and pursuit missions which were assigned him and has had numerous engagements with enemy planes. On 12 March 1916, he had two combats; during the course of one of them he allowed his observer to down a plane in the enemy lines." (Médaille militaire citation, 5 April 1916)

Sources of information

References

 Franks, Norman, (2000). Nieuport Aces of World War 1. Oxford, UK: Osprey Publishing, 2000. , .
 Norman Franks; Bailey, Frank (1993). Over the Front: The Complete Record of the Fighter Aces and Units of the United States and French Air Services, 1914–1918 London, UK: Grub Street Publishing. .; Bailey, Frank (1993). Over the Front: The Complete Record of the Fighter Aces and Units of the United States and French Air Services, 1914–1918 London, UK: Grub Street Publishing. .

1889 births
1916 deaths
French World War I flying aces
Chevaliers of the Légion d'honneur
Recipients of the Croix de Guerre 1914–1918 (France)
French military personnel killed in World War I